James Smith (28 April 1820 – 19 March 1910) was an English-born Australian journalist and encyclopedist, leader-writer and drama critic for the Melbourne Age.

Early life
Smith was born at Loose near Maidstone, Kent, England, son of James Smith, supervisor of inland revenue, and his wife Mary. Smith junior was initially educated for the church, however, he took up journalism and at the age of 20 was editing the Hertfordshire Mercury and County Press.  In 1845 he published Rural Records or Glimpses of Village Life, which was followed by Oracles from the British Poets (London, 1849), Wilton and its Associations (Salisbury, 1851), and Lights and Shadows of Artist Life and Character (1853). Between 1848 and 1854 he was the editor of the Salisbury and Winchester Journal.

Career in Australia
In 1854 Smith emigrated to Victoria, Australia and became a leader-writer and drama critic on The Age and first editor of the Melbourne weekly The Leader. He joined the staff of The Argus in 1856 and wrote leading articles, literary reviews, and dramatic criticism. He also wrote leading articles for country papers. He was editor of Melbourne Punch 1857–63 and of a short-lived (1860–61) weekly entitled Victorian Review.

Feeling the strain of overwork in 1863 he intended making a holiday visit to Europe, but was offered and accepted the post of librarian to the Victorian parliament. Smith was not content to merely carry out the routine duties of his position, he had always been a tireless worker, and during his five years librarianship he reclassified and catalogued about 30,000 volumes. The office was temporarily abolished in 1868, and Smith resumed his duties on The Argus, and continued to work for it until he retired in 1896 at the age of 76, perhaps pressured to do so on account of his "leaning towards spiritualism". He still, however, did much journalistic work, and even when approaching the age of 90 was contributing valued articles to The Age under the initials J. S.

He helped found the Melbourne Shakespeare Society in 1884 and Melbourne chapters of the Garrick Club in 1855, Alliance Française in 1890 and the Dante Society in 1896.
Smith was the first to suggest the foundation of a National Gallery; his influence on Melbourne art was great as trustee of the Public Library, Museums and National Gallery of Victoria (1880–1910) and treasurer of the trustees from 1888. As a drama critic Smith was productive and able, although not as experienced or competent as fellow critic James Edward Neild. Smith helped Louis Buvelot to gain recognition as an artist, and his favourable review of the work of the then unknown Tom Roberts in 1881 showed his ability to recognize potential talent.

Smith died of cystitis at Hawthorn in Melbourne on 19 March 1910 and was buried in the Boroondara General Cemetery. He married twice and was survived by two sons and three daughters from his second marriage.

Legacy
In addition to the works mentioned Smith was the author of From Melbourne to Melrose (1888), a collection of travel notes originally contributed to The Argus, and Junius Unveiled (London, 1909). Smith also published many pamphlets, some of which are concerned with spiritualism, in which he was very interested during the last 40 years of his life. He contributed a large amount of the letterpress to the Picturesque Atlas of Australasia, and edited The Cyclopedia of Victoria (1903), a piece of hack-work in which he could have taken little pleasure, but described in The Oxford Companion to Australian Literature as "important". He wrote a three-act drama, 'Garibaldi', successfully produced at the Prince of Wales Theatre, Melbourne in 1860, and 'A Broil at the Café', also produced at Melbourne a few years later. He was a member of the council of the Working Men's College of Melbourne (now Royal Melbourne Institute of Technology) and a trustee for many years of the public library, museums, and the National Gallery of Victoria. A competent linguist, he was interested in the Alliance Française and the Melbourne Dante Society, of which he became the president. These activities led to his being made an officer of the French Academy, and a knight of the Order of the Crown of Italy for his research into Italian literature.

Smith was a skilled journalist who with his good memory and fine library could produce an excellent article on almost any subject at the shortest notice. During his 56 years of residence at Melbourne he had significant influence on the cultural life of the city.

References

Further reading

1820 births
1910 deaths
19th-century Australian journalists
19th-century Australian male writers
Australian editors
People from Loose, Kent
English emigrants to colonial Australia
Settlers of Melbourne
19th-century British journalists
Australian male journalists